Steve Vinovich (born January 22, 1945) is an American actor.

Biography
Vinovich was born in Peoria, Illinois, the son of Jennie J. (née Kuhel), a secretary, and Stephen J. Vinovich, an insurance salesman. His paternal grandparents are Croatian. His maternal grandparents are Slovenian.

Vinovich has appeared in several feature films such as B.J Wert in 1987's Mannequin, and Dr. Novos in the 1994 comedy The Santa Clause. He also voiced Puffin in the 1994 animated film The Swan Princess and one of the only three actors of the original cast to reprise his role for the two direct-to-video sequels (the others being Michelle Nicastro as Odette and James Arrington as Chamberlain).

He appeared in The Foreigner at Corn Stock Theatre in Peoria, IL the summer of 2013 and has appeared in Broadway shows including Waitress, All The Way, Lost in Yonkers, The Grand Tour and The Robber Bridegroom.

He is married to actress Carolyn Mignini.

Filmography

References

External links

1945 births
Living people
American male film actors
American male television actors
American male video game actors
American male voice actors
American people of Serbian descent
Actors from Peoria, Illinois
Male actors from Illinois
20th-century American male actors
21st-century American male actors